Westlake Corner is a census-designated place in Franklin County, Virginia, United States. The population was 976 at the 2010 census. It is part of the Roanoke Metropolitan Statistical Area.

Geography
Westlake Corner is located in northeastern Franklin County at  (37.133117, −79.678794), adjacent to Smith Mountain Lake. Its northeastern border is the Roanoke River arm of the lake, which forms the Bedford County line. It is bordered to the south by the North Shore CDP. Virginia State Route 122 passes through the CDP, leading southwest  to Rocky Mount, the Franklin County seat, and northeast across the Roanoke River  to Bedford.

History and culture 
Booker T. Washington National Monument, comprising the tobacco farm where the African American educator and leader was born a slave, is in the western part of the CDP.

In the 1940s and 1950s, the town was known for its Ku Klux Klan activity.

A farmers' market operates between April and October.

Demographics
As of the census of 2000, there were 899 people, 389 households, and 322 families residing in the CDP. The population density was 89.2 people per square mile (34.4/km2). There were 515 housing units at an average density of 51.1/sq mi (19.7/km2). The racial makeup of the CDP was 96.44% White, 2.56% African American, 0.33% Asian, 0.11% Pacific Islander, 0.11% from other races, and 0.44% from two or more races. Hispanic or Latino of any race were 0.78% of the population.

There were 389 households, out of which 21.3% had children under the age of 18 living with them, 74.3% were married couples living together, 5.9% had a female householder with no husband present, and 17.2% were non-families. 14.4% of all households were made up of individuals, and 6.4% had someone living alone who was 65 years of age or older. The average household size was 2.31 and the average family size was 2.51.

In the CDP, the population was spread out, with 16.6% under the age of 18, 4.9% from 18 to 24, 23.4% from 25 to 44, 33.4% from 45 to 64, and 21.8% who were 65 years of age or older. The median age was 50 years. For every 100 females there were 107.6 males. For every 100 females age 18 and over, there were 104.4 males.

The median income for a household in the CDP was $50,405, and the median income for a family was $50,709. Males had a median income of $33,686 versus $22,778 for females. The per capita income for the CDP was $26,915. About 3.9% of families and 3.2% of the population were below the poverty line, including none of those under age 18 and 8.5% of those age 65 or over.

References

Census-designated places in Franklin County, Virginia